Lorenzo Acquarone (25 February 1931 – 24 March 2020) was an Italian lawyer and politician.

Biography 
Born in Ventimiglia on February 25, 1931, Acquarone graduated in law and became a lawyer. He would go on to become a Professor in 1961, and from 1966 to 2006 was a faculty member of the University of Genoa.

Acquarone entered politics as a member of the Christian Democrats, as a Senator in the Italian Senate between 1987 and 1994. Following his career in the Senate, he became a leader of the Italian People's Party with whom he was elected to the Chamber of Deputies, where he served from 1994 to 2006. In 2002 he participated in the formation of the new political entity called the "Margherita" or Democracy is Freedom - The Daisy, but in September 2003 decided to leave the party to join the Popular-UDEUR.

Acquarone died at the age of 89 on March 24, 2020, due to COVID-19, during the COVID-19 pandemic in Italy.

Honors

External links 

 Italian Senate Page
 Italian Parliament Page
 Italian Chamber of Deputies Page

References

1931 births
2020 deaths
20th-century Italian lawyers
Deaths from the COVID-19 pandemic in Liguria
Democracy is Freedom – The Daisy politicians
People from Ventimiglia
Academic staff of the University of Genoa
Deputies of Legislature XII of Italy
Deputies of Legislature XIII of Italy
Deputies of Legislature XIV of Italy
Senators of Legislature XI of Italy
Senators of Legislature X of Italy
Italian People's Party (1994) politicians
Knights Grand Cross of the Order of Merit of the Italian Republic
Union of Democrats for Europe politicians